Aurore Verhoeven (born 15 January 1990) is a French professional racing cyclist, who most recently rode for UCI Women's Continental Team .

Major results

2008
 4th Road race, UEC European Junior Road Championships
 6th Road race, UCI Juniors World Championships
2010
 7th Tour of Chongming Island World Cup
 8th Chrono des Nations
 10th Overall Tour of Chongming Island Stage race
2013
 8th Classica Citta di Padova
2015
 7th Grand Prix de Dottignies
2017
 6th Grand Prix de Dottignies
 9th Diamond Tour
2019
 10th Erondegemse Pijl

See also
 List of 2015 UCI Women's Teams and riders

References

External links
 

1990 births
Living people
French female cyclists
Sportspeople from Neuilly-sur-Seine
Cyclists from Île-de-France
20th-century French women
21st-century French women